"Wild Weekend" is an instrumental written by Phil Todaro and Tom Shannon and performed by The Rockin' Rebels.  It reached #8 on the U.S. pop chart and #28 on the U.S. R&B chart in 1963. The song was originally recorded as the theme for Shannon's show on WKBW in Buffalo, New York; the song title is not found in the song's original lyrics (Shannon's show aired on weekdays). and was later reworked and featured on The Rebels 1962 album Wild Weekend.

The song ranked #22 on Billboard magazine's Top 100 singles of 1963.

Other versions
Bill Justis released a version of the song on his 1963 album Bill Justis Plays 12 Instrumental Smash Hits.
 Disc jockey Joey Reynolds (who had worked with Shannon at WWKB) added lyrics to make this the theme song for his nightly show on WPOP, Hartford, 1963. 
The Surfaris released a version of the song on their 1963 album Wipe Out.
Kim Fowley released a version of the song on his 1968 album Born to Be Wild.
Andy Mackay released a version of the song as a single in 1974 in the UK, but it did not chart.  It was featured on his album In Search of Eddie Riff.
Jon and the Nightriders released a version of the song on their 1987 album Stampede!
NRBQ released a version of the song as a single in 1989 with lyrics entitled "It's a Wild Weekend", but it did not chart.
Euphoria's Id released a live version of the song on their 2003 compilation album Mastering the Art of French Kissing.
The Ventures released a version of the song on their 2009 compilation album with The Fabulous Wailers entitled Two Car Garage (50 Years of Rock 'N Roll).
Beaver Brown released a live version of the song on their 2017 album Live at the Bottom Line 1980.
The Thunderbirds (Australia) charted with a single in 1961

References

1962 songs
1962 singles
1974 singles
1989 singles
Bill Justis songs
The Surfaris songs
The Ventures songs
Swan Records singles
Island Records singles
Virgin Records singles
Surf instrumentals
1960s instrumentals